The shark mackerel (Grammatorcynus bicarinatus) is a species of Spanish mackerel (tribe Scomberomorini) in the scombrid family (Scombridae).

This species is sometimes also called the  largescaled tunny, large-scaled tunny  or salmon mackerel.  Before 1983, this species was sometimes confused with Grammatorcynus bilineatus, the double-lined mackerel.

References

Grammatorcynus
Scombridae
Fish described in 1825